"Here Comes That Feeling" is a song written by Dorsey Burnette and Joe Osborne and performed by Brenda Lee.  The song reached No.5 in the UK and No.89 on the Billboard Hot 100 in 1962.  The also song reached No. 40 in Australia.

References

1962 songs
1962 singles
Songs written by Dorsey Burnette
Brenda Lee songs
Decca Records singles